Tour Ivoirien de la Paix was a professional road bicycle racing event held in Côte d'Ivoire in 2008. The 6-day stage race was part of the UCI Africa Tour as a 2.1 rated event. A second edition of the race was planned for 2011, but was never held.

Past winners

External links

UCI Africa Tour races
Cycle races in Ivory Coast
Recurring sporting events established in 2008
2008 establishments in Ivory Coast